The black-crowned tityra (Tityra inquisitor) is a medium-sized passerine bird. It has traditionally been placed in the cotinga or the tyrant flycatcher family, but evidence strongly suggest it is better placed in Tityridae.

It is found in Argentina, Belize, Bolivia, Brazil, Colombia, Costa Rica, Ecuador, French Guiana, Guatemala, Guyana, Honduras, Mexico, Nicaragua, Panama, Paraguay, Peru, Suriname, Trinidad and Tobago, and Venezuela.
Its natural habitats are subtropical or tropical moist lowland forests and heavily degraded former forest.

Taxonomy

Subspecies 
 Tityra inquisitor inquisitor: Tropical southeast Brazil (s Piauí) to east Paraguay and northeast Argentina
 Tityra inquisitor fraserii: Tropical southeast Mexico (San Luis Potosí) to central Panama
 Tityra inquisitor albitorques: Tropical east Panama to northwest Bolivia and west Amazonian Brazil
 Tityra inquisitor buckleyi: Tropical southeast Colombia (Caquetá) and east Ecuador (Napo-Pastaza)
 Tityra inquisitor erythrogenys: Tropical east Colombia to Venezuela, the Guianas and north Brazil
 Tityra inquisitor pelzelni: Tropical northeast Bolivia, Mato Grosso and Brazil south of the Amazon

The syntypes of Psaris fraserii Kaup (Proc. Zool. Soc. London, pt. 19. ,1851 (1852), p.47. pl. 37-38), an adult male and female, are held in the vertebrate zoology collection of National Museums Liverpool at World Museum, with accession number NML-VZ D1868 and NML-VZ D1868a. The specimen came to the Liverpool national collection via the 13th Earl of Derby’s collection which was bequeathed to the people of Liverpool in 1851.

References

Further reading

black-crowned tityra
Birds of Central America
Birds of South America
black-crowned tityra
Taxonomy articles created by Polbot